The Bristol Type 109 was a British two-seat long-distance biplane built by the Bristol Aeroplane Company at Filton Aerodrome, England.

Design and development
The Type 109 was a single-engine two-seat conventional biplane built in 1928 for an attempt on the world distance record. The Type 109, registered G-EBZK and powered by a 480 hp (360 kW) Bristol Jupiter VIII radial engine, was first flown on 7 September 1928. The record attempt was abandoned and the aircraft was then modified to be used by Bert Hinkler for a world flight. The world flight was also abandoned and the aircraft was used by Bristol as an engine test bed for the Jupiter XIF engine. The Type 109 was scrapped in 1931, never having flown beyond the UK.

Specifications

Notes

References

 

1920s British civil utility aircraft
Type 109
Aircraft first flown in 1928